Leave It All Behind is the second studio album by the Foreign Exchange, released in 2008. At the 52nd Annual Grammy Awards, "Daykeeper" was nominated for the Grammy Award for Best Urban/Alternative Performance.

Track listing

Charts

References

External links
 

2008 albums
The Foreign Exchange albums
Albums produced by Nicolay (musician)